A comeback (or come-from-behind) is an occurrence of an athlete or sports team engaged in a competition overcoming a substantial disadvantage in points or position. It has been described as "the single greatest aspect of competition that most embodies the spirit of what makes sport extraordinary". It has been observed in spectator sports that "dramatic play seems to involve both players; cheering would often escalate when one player gained momentum, and then his/her opponent suddenly turned the tables and made a comeback", with such a result drawing more enthusiasm than one competitor defeating the other without giving up any points. Fans are likely to feel better about a team that loses after staging a "comeback that fell just short" than a team that lost by the same score after having played evenly throughout the match and then allowed the other team the winning score at the end.

In some sports, particularly those regulated by a game clock, the time that it takes to score points makes a comeback impossible when there is too great a point disadvantage to overcome in the time remaining. It has been noted, however, that in "some sports, such as tennis or baseball, a comeback is possible until the very last point, regardless of what the deficit might be". Many sporting news outlets have compiled lists of "greatest comebacks" for various sports.

Some academic study of sports comebacks has been conducted. One study indicated that in the sports of basketball, football and ice hockey, the team leading in points at the beginning of the final period of play wins the game 80% of the time, with the trailing team overcoming this disadvantage 20% of the time. Another determined that the home team advantage has a significant impact on the probability of a team engineering a late comeback, noting that for professional basketball teams, "the home team is more than three times as likely to make a fourth-quarter comeback than is the visiting team (33.3% versus 10.5%)". A comeback by one competitor may coincide with, or be alternatively characterized, as a "choke" by the opponent allowing the comeback.

The term "comeback" can also refer to performers returning to (or attempting to return to) their former level of competition after an adverse event that seems to threaten their careers and/or a lengthy period of absence, whether that hiatus was caused by voluntary retirement, injury, other medical reason and/or some other circumstance(s). Use of the term in this context can also be found in fields such as politics and the entertainment industry, in addition to sports.

American football
There is no official definition or statistic for comebacks in American football, but many fans note the ability of certain teams to mount a comeback late in the game. A team may have a second-half comeback after having fallen well behind in the first half, or a fourth-quarter comeback after having fallen well behind with only one quarter of play remaining.

Certain comebacks are particularly historically significant. For example, in American football, "The Comeback" refers to a specific NFL playoff game between the Buffalo Bills and the Houston Oilers played January 3, 1993. It featured the Bills recovering from a 32-point deficit shortly after halftime to win in overtime, 41–38, the largest comeback in terms of points (at that time) in NFL history, postseason or regular season. This has been referred to as "the greatest comeback in NFL history". Another prominent example of a comeback came in Super Bowl LI, played on February 5, 2017, where the New England Patriots, down by 25 points (28–3) in the third quarter, would eventually defeat the Atlanta Falcons in overtime, 34–28, for its second championship title in three years. The Patriots 25 point comeback was the largest in Super Bowl history.

The 2006 Michigan State vs. Northwestern football game featured the largest comeback in NCAA Division I-A history, when the Michigan State Spartans rallied to score 38 unanswered points to beat the Northwestern Wildcats 41–38 after falling behind 38–3 with 9:54 left in the 3rd quarter.

In the 2006 Insight Bowl, the Texas Tech Red Raiders completed the largest comeback in NCAA Division I-A Bowl Game history. The Minnesota Golden Gophers led 38–7 with 7:47 left in the 3rd quarter. Texas Tech quarterback Graham Harrell scored two touchdowns, running back Shannon Woods scored another TD, and kicker Alex Trlica hit the game-tying 52-yard field goal as time expired in regulation. Gophers QB Bryan Cupito led a drive capped off by a Joel Monroe field goal. Shannon Woods ended the game with a 3-yard rushing touchdown to complete the thrilling comeback. 

In the 2016 Valero Alamo Bowl, the TCU Horned Frogs tied the aforementioned Texas Tech Red Raiders for the largest comeback in NCAA Division I-A Bowl Game history. The Oregon Ducks led 31–0 at halftime. The Ducks' star quarterback Vernon Adams Jr. left the game with an injury. TCU backup QB Bram Kohlhausen (who was playing for starter Trevone Boykin as he was suspended for off-the-field issues) led an unbelievable 31-point second half to tie the game. The Frogs ended up winning the game 47–41 in 3OT after the Ducks failed to convert on 4th Down.

On December 17, 2022, the Minnesota Vikings defeated the Indianapolis Colts 39–36 in overtime after being down 33–0 at the half. This surpassed the previous record referred to as "The Comeback" where the Buffalo Bills rallied to win after being down 32 points to defeat the Houston Oilers with backup quarterback Frank Reich in overtime 41–38.

Association football
The ability for a comeback to occur in association football is limited by the game clock.

A notable example of such a comeback is Charlton Athletic F.C. 7–6 Huddersfield Town A.F.C., 21 December 1957. With 27 minutes left, Charlton were losing 5–1 and down to ten men. However, they scored six more goals to win 7–6.

An example of a record breaking comeback is FC Barcelona (6–1, 6–5 on aggregate) against Paris Saint-Germain F.C. in the UEFA Champions League round of 16 on March 8, 2017 at Camp Nou, Barcelona. It was the first time in UEFA Champions League history that a team had overcome a four-goal deficit in order to qualify for the quarterfinals.

Other famous examples of comebacks in football history include the 1999 UEFA Champions League Final when Manchester United F.C. were down 1–0 to FC Bayern Munich with only 3 minutes of added time remaining and won 2–1 with goals from Teddy Sheringham in the 90+1 minute and Ole Gunnar Solskjær in the 90+3 minute, and also the 2005 UEFA Champions League Final in which after trailing 3–0 in the second half Liverpool F.C scored three goals in six minutes against A.C. Milan before ultimately defeating Milan in a penalty shootout when the match ended 3–3 after extra time.

Other comebacks also include Liverpool F.C (FC Barcelona 0–4 Liverpool FC, 4–3 on aggregate) against FC Barcelona in the 2018–19 UEFA Champions League Semi-finals. With Liverpool being down 3–0 after the first game, Divock Origi and Georginio Wijnaldum came to the rescue as both netted 2 goals each, and an extraordinary corner kick from Trent Alexander-Arnold would give the Reds a 4–3 lead on aggregate, sending them through to the 2019 UEFA Champions League Final which they eventually ended up winning versus Tottenham Hotspur 2–0. In the other semifinal, contested between Spurs and Ajax, another great comeback was performed by the London club. With Ajax having won their away leg 1–0, and winning their home leg 2–0 at half-time, Spurs needed to score three goals in the second half to win the game. Lucas Moura scored a hat-trick that sent them to their first UEFA Champions League Final on away goals, with the winning goal coming in the 96th minute.

Real Madrid completed three successful comebacks in the 2021–22 UEFA Champions League knockout phase. In the Round of 16, Paris Saint-Germain F.C. led Real in the aggregate score 2–0 with about 30 minutes left to be played. Karim Benzema made a hat-trick in just 17 minutes to take the Spanish side to the next round, in Quarter-finals, after defeating Chelsea Football Club 1–3 at Stamford Bridge on the first leg with another hat-trick by Benzema. Madrid allowed three goals in the second leg at Estadio Santiago Bernabéu to lose the advantage 4–3, then Rodrygo Goes made a late goal in the 80th minute to even the aggregate, assisted by Luka Modrić, in the subsequent extra-time. Benzema scored with a header once more to reach the Semi-finals, on this round, after losing 4–3 to Manchester City at Etihad Stadium, a match that had Madrid being two goals behind three times (2–0, 3–1 and 4–2). Riyad Mahrez scored late in the second half of the second leg to apparently secure a final berth for City, however, Rodrygo made a double in the 90th and 91st minutes to equalize the semi-final. Later Benzema successfully took a penalty in the fifth minute of the extra time to put Real ahead of the aggregate for the first time. The match ended 3–1 and Los Blancos reached the final, eventually winning it with a goal by Vinicius Jr. and an outstanding performance by goalkeeper Thibaut Courtois on 28 May 2022 at the Stade de France in Saint-Denis.

Baseball

In baseball, a comeback is theoretically possible at any point in the game up until the event that ends the game itself. There are no time constraints that would prevent a team from using its very last opportunity for play to score enough consecutive runs to win the game (or to tie the game, forcing extra innings).

In terms of individual games, on three occasions in Major League Baseball history, a team has come back from being twelve runs down to win the game:
 June 18, 1911, the Detroit Tigers overcame a 12-run deficit against the Chicago White Sox.
 June 15, 1925, the Philadelphia Athletics overcame a 12-run deficit against the Cleveland Indians.
 August 5, 2001, the Cleveland Indians overcame a 12-run deficit against the Seattle Mariners, winning 15–14 in the 11th inning.

With respect to comebacks over a series of multiple games, in MLB series play, the Boston Red Sox defeating the Yankees in the 2004 American League Championship Series is the only time in MLB history any team has won a seven game series after trailing three games to none.

Basketball
A team may have a second-half comeback after having fallen well behind in the first half, or a fourth-quarter comeback after having fallen well behind with only one quarter of play remaining.

The greatest comeback in National Basketball Association play occurred on November 27, 1996, when the Utah Jazz, down by 36 points to the Denver Nuggets late in the second quarter (it was 70–36 at the half and 70-34 just before), overcame this deficit to win 107–103. In the 2019 NBA playoffs the Los Angeles Clippers trailed by 31 points, before overcoming the Golden State Warriors 135–131.

The greatest comeback in NCAA Division I history occurred on February 22, 2018 when Drexel overcame a 34-point deficit against Delaware. This surpassed the previous record, a February 1994 game between the Kentucky Wildcats and the Louisiana State University Tigers, in which the Wildcats were down by 31 points, but came back to win 99–95. In the Philippines, the San Miguel Beermen became the first basketball team in history to ever win a best-of-7 title series from 0-3 down after beating Alaska Aces in Game 7 of the 2015–16 PBA Philippine Cup Finals.

NCAA

End of period
These comebacks happened at the end of regulation or the end of an overtime period in a short amount of time:

Long comebacks

In the 2012 NCAA Division I men's basketball tournament, both games of the March 13 session set NCAA postseason records, for largest deficit overcome within the final five minutes of a game (16) and largest deficit at any point in the game overcome (25).

NBA
The following comebacks are based solely on a points deficit basis:

Regular season
36 points — Utah Jazz vs. Denver Nuggets (November 27, 1996)

The Utah Jazz defeated the Denver Nuggets 107 to 103 on November 27, 1996.  The Jazz, playing before a hometown crowd at the Delta Center, trailed 70 to 36 at halftime. The lead had been increased by 2 points in the third quarter to make it a 36 point deficit. Led by the scoring efforts of Karl Malone with 31 points and Jeff Hornacek contributing 29 points, the Utah Jazz secured the win to overcome the largest deficit in NBA history.

35 points - Los Angeles Clippers vs. Washington Wizards (January 25, 2022)

The Los Angeles Clippers stunned the Washington Wizards 116-115 on January 25, 2022 at the Capital One Arena in Washington, DC. Nearing halftime, the Wizards had a commanding lead over the Clippers, as they led by as much as 35 in the quarter. Despite a commanding lead and 23 points by leading scorer Bradley Beal, the Wizards gave up 80 points to the Clippers in the second half, including a 4-point play with 1.9 seconds to go by Luke Kennard. This ties the Kings vs. Bulls game of 2009 as the second largest comeback in NBA history, as the Clippers came back from 35 down to win the game. 

35 points — Sacramento Kings vs. Chicago Bulls (December 21, 2009)

The Sacramento Kings defeated the Chicago Bulls 102-98 on December 21, 2009 at Chicago's United Center. Trailing for three quarters, with the largest deficit at 35 points with less than 9 minutes remaining in the third quarter, the Kings rallied behind the scoring of Tyreke Evans' 23 points. Sacramento overcame the Bulls in the fourth quarter despite a 26-point performance by Chicago's Luol Deng. This comeback constitutes the second largest comeback in NBA history.

32 points — Boston Celtics vs. San Antonio Spurs (April 30, 2021)

The Boston Celtics trailed by as many as 32 points late in the second quarter, including an 84-53 deficit in the third quarter. The Celtics outscored the Spurs 42-26 in the third quarter to  cut the lead to 13. Led by Jayson Tatum's 60 points, the Celtics managed to force overtime and win narrowly 143–140.

30 points — Toronto Raptors vs. Dallas Mavericks (December 22, 2019)

The Raptors were down 85–55 with 2:55 to go in the 3rd quarter. The Raptors then scored 47 points in the 4th quarter to win 110–107, led by Kyle Lowry who scored 20 of his 32 points in the fourth quarter.

30 points — Dallas Mavericks vs. Los Angeles Lakers (December 6, 2002)

The Los Angeles Lakers were down 30 in the 3rd quarter and trailing by 27 entering the 4th. On the back of 21 points from Kobe Bryant, the Lakers came back to win 105–103. Fittingly, Bryant scored with 8.4 seconds remaining, giving the Lakers their first lead of the game and held on for the win.

29 points — Milwaukee Bucks vs. Atlanta Hawks (November 25, 1977)

The fifth largest NBA comeback occurred at Atlanta's Omni Coliseum on November 25, 1977. The Milwaukee Bucks, down 29 points to the Atlanta Hawks, came back to win 117–115. This game had the largest fourth quarter comeback in NBA history. Milwaukee's Junior Bridgerman led the comeback effort with 24 points and held off Atlanta's high scorer John Drew with 30 points on the night.

29 points — Dallas Mavericks vs. Minnesota Timberwolves (December 30, 2008)

The Dallas Mavericks defeated the Minnesota Timberwolves 107 to 100 on December 30, 2008 to overcome a 29-point third quarter deficit. Jason Terry led all Mavericks scorers with 29 points while Dirk Nowitzki added 24 points. The game was played at Dallas' American Airlines Center.

28 points - Brooklyn Nets vs. New York Knicks (February 16, 2022)

The Brooklyn Nets overcame a 28-point deficit against the New York Knicks in Madison Square Garden, ultimately winning 111-106. Nets rookie Cam Thomas scored 16 points in the fourth quarter, including a 29-foot three with 6.8 seconds left to seal the win for the Nets.

28 points - Portland Trail Blazers vs. Sacramento Kings (April 10, 2019)

The Portland Trail Blazers defeated the Sacramento Kings from a 28-point deficit on April 10, 2019 at home court. The Kings led by 28 points with 30 seconds left in the first half. 136-131 was the final score.

28 points - Sacramento Kings vs. Brooklyn Nets (March 19, 2019)

The Brooklyn Nets defeated the Sacramento Kings from a 28-point deficit on March 19, 2019 at the Golden1 Center. D'Angelo Russell scored 27 points in the fourth quarter to lead the Nets to win. Russell set a new career-high of 44 points in the game. 121-123 is the official score.

28 points — Los Angeles Clippers vs. Boston Celtics (February 9, 2019)

The Los Angeles Clippers defeated the Boston Celtics on February 9, 2019 to overcome a 28-point deficit at the TD Garden. Montrezl Harell led the Clippers in scoring with 21 points in the comeback effort. Kyrie Irving sprained his ankle with 4:09 left in the 2nd quarter and exited the game with 2:28 left in the quarter.

28 points — Brooklyn Nets vs. Boston Celtics (March 3, 2023)

The Brooklyn Nets came back from a 23-51 second-quarter deficit with 7:32 remaining to defeat the Boston Celtics in TD Garden. The Nets tied the game at 70 at 6:45 in the third quarter and outscored the Celtics 92 to 54 to win 115-105. Mikal Bridges scored a game-high 38 points for Brooklyn.

27 points — Miami Heat vs. Cleveland Cavaliers (March 20, 2013)

At Quicken Loans Arena, the Miami Heat overcame at the time league high 27-point third-quarter deficit to beat the Cleveland Cavaliers 98-95 and extend their winning streak to 24 games.

27 points — Toronto Raptors vs. Golden State Warriors (December 3, 2013)

At Oracle Arena in Oakland, the Toronto Raptors held a 75–48 advantage over the Golden State Warriors with just over 9 minutes remaining in the third quarter. Led by Steph Curry and Klay Thompson, the Warriors outscored Toronto 64–28 in the final 21:20 by means of tremendous 3-point shooting to come away with a 112–103 win at home.

27 points — Los Angeles Lakers vs. Dallas Mavericks (February 26, 2023)

At American Airlines Center, the Lakers were trailing by a score of 18-45 5 minutes into the 2nd Quarter. Vanderbilt sparked the comeback and had a great defensive game with 17 rebounds. At halftime they were down 47-61, 13 points less. Anthony Davis led the comeback with 30 points and 15 rebounds. A late foul call led to Dennis Schröder making a freethrow and sealing the comeback as the Lakers won 111-108.

Post-season
31 points - Los Angeles Clippers vs Golden State Warriors (April 15, 2019)

The Los Angeles Clippers trailed 94–63 with 7:31 left in the 3rd quarter as Stephen Curry was benched for his 4th foul of the game. The Clippers cut it down to as much as 2 mid-way through the 4th quarter. Landry Shamet made a game winning 3 pointer with 15.9 seconds left to give the Clippers a 133–131 lead. Lou Williams led the Clippers with 36 points in the comeback effort as Montrezl Harrell helped with 25 points as the 2nd leading scorer of the game and hit 2 free throws to seal the game. The Clippers won the game 135–131 in the comeback effort.

29 points - Los Angeles Lakers vs Seattle SuperSonics (May 4, 1989)

Trailing 41-12 early in the second quarter, the Lakers mounted a comeback that cut the SuperSonics' lead to 54-43 by half-time, 73-65 by the end of the 3rd quarter, and finally won the game 97–95.

27 points - Los Angeles Clippers vs Memphis Grizzlies (April 29, 2012)

26 points - New Jersey Nets vs. Boston Celtics (May 25, 2002)

Paul Pierce lead the Boston Celtics to a 26-point comeback against the New Jersey Nets to win Game 3 of the 2002 Eastern Conference Finals by a score of 94-90, outscoring the Nets 41-16 in the fourth quarter.

26 points - Cleveland Cavaliers vs. Indiana Pacers (April 20, 2017)

Trailing by as much as 26, the Cleveland Cavaliers overcame a 25-point half-time deficit to take a commanding 3-0 First round series lead over the Indiana Pacers and further fuel what would become a historic 10-game playoff win-streak. LeBron James would score 41 points and a triple-double in another career night performance.

26 points - Atlanta Hawks vs. Philadelphia 76ers (June 16, 2021)

The Atlanta Hawks came back after being down 26 with 8:31 left in the third quarter. Joel Embiid and Seth Curry were the only 76ers players to make field goals in the second half, allowing for the Atlanta Hawks to win 109-106.

26 points - Memphis Grizzlies vs. Minnesota Timberwolves (April 21, 2022)

The Memphis Grizzlies came back after trailnts, 10 rebounds and 10 assists. The Memphis Grizzlies, down by 83-67 at the end of the third quarter, outscored the Minnesota Timberwolves 37-12 in the fourth quarter to win the game 104-95.

25 points - Golden State Warriors vs. San Antonio Spurs (May 14, 2017)

The Golden State Warriors came back from a 25-point deficit, led by Steph Curry's 40 points and Kevin Durant's 34 points. Curry led the team with 7 made threes and 14 made field goals. Precipitating the comeback was the injury of the Spurs' first option, Kawhi Leonard. The Warriors won 113–111.

25 points - Oklahoma City Thunder vs. Utah Jazz (April 25, 2018)

The Oklahoma City Thunder erased a 25-point comeback in the third quarter of the NBA first round against the Utah Jazz. Russell Westbrook's 45 points and Paul George's 34 points saved the Thunder from elimination to force a Game 6.

25 points - Los Angeles Clippers vs. Utah Jazz (June 18, 2021)

The Los Angeles Clippers had been trailing as much as 25 points during the game. In the 3rd and 4th quarters, the Clippers embarked on large runs to eventually seal the game 131-119, winning the Western Conference Semifinal series in Game 6 and advancing to their first Western Conference Final.

Cricket
The ability for a comeback to occur in cricket is limited in all cases by the number of wickets and innings a team has left ("wickets" meaning the number of batsmen they have who have not yet been dismissed during their "innings", with each innings being a scoring turn for the team), and additionally either, in limited overs cricket, by the number of legal deliveries (periods of play) each team is allotted to score off of (with teams generally expected to score at most six runs per delivery), or in first-class cricket, the time limit.

Limited-overs cricket 
In limited overs cricket, where the teams each get one innings, comebacks look significantly different than they do in other sports: this is because during the first half of the game, only one team (the "first-batting" team) is allowed to score, while in the second half of the game, either the game immediately ends when the other team (the "chasing" team) takes the lead (akin to baseball's walkoff), or the game is won/tied by the first-batting team, with only some games featuring tiebreakers. This means that anytime the chasing team wins a limited-overs match, they do so having never taken the lead until the end of the game; conversely, anytime the first-batting team wins, they do so having never trailed during the game. Comebacks in limited-overs cricket therefore have less to do with the actual lead or deficit teams have on the scoreboard, and more to do with how teams perform against the number of runs they are projected to score from their innings, which is generally determined by looking at their run rate and other factors. This means that the first-batting team can be said to "come back" during the second half of the game even though they are not the ones scoring, because the chasing team was initially scoring very quickly and appeared on target to take the lead, only to be defeated by a good defensive performance by the first-batting team which slowed down the chasing team's scoring rate and/or ended the chasing team's innings early.

Examples 
One example of a limited-overs comeback came in the 1996 Cricket World Cup semi-final between Australia and the West Indies, with each team allotted 50 overs (50 sets of 6 legal deliveries). Australia had scored a total of 207 runs in the first half of the match, and the West Indies had gotten to 165 runs with nine overs (54 legal deliveries) remaining in the second half of the match, having lost only two wickets in the first 41 overs of their innings. This meant that the West Indies needed to score an average of 4.77 runs per remaining over (0.8 runs per remaining ball) to take the lead and win the game, with Australia able to win or at least tie the game if they could either complete the remaining nine overs while conceding less than 4.77 runs per remaining over, or take the remaining eight out of ten of the West Indies' wickets before the West Indies could take the lead. Australia was able to win by 5 runs by taking the latter path, only allowing the West Indies to score another 37 runs (reaching a final score of 202) for the loss of their final eight wickets. Had the West Indies not lost so many wickets, they would have had 3 deliveries remaining in the game to try to close the 5-run deficit.

First-class cricket 
In first-class cricket, where the trailing team must complete two innings within the five-day time limit to lose, one type of "comeback" is when a trailing team manages to "salvage the draw"; this means that the trailing team's batsmen avoid getting out (being dismissed/losing their wickets), thus prolonging their innings long enough that time runs out and neither team wins or ties. Some notable instances of this occurring have been where certain batsman have batted for long periods of time, such as Hanif Mohammad's 16 hours of batting against the West Indies. A much rarer, but truer type of comeback can occur when a team wins after being forced to follow on; this means the winning team had been trailing by a significant (200+ run) margin after both teams had completed one of their innings, but managed to win after both teams had completed two innings. This has only happened three times in international cricket.

Handball

EHF Champions League
In the 2015-16 EHF Champions League final, MVM Veszprem led Vive Targi Kielce 28-19 after 45 minutes of play. Kielce scored nine unanswered goals to win in the penalties 39-38.

Ice hockey
The ability for a comeback to occur in ice hockey is limited by the game clock.

NHL

Regular season
The following regular season comebacks are the largest in NHL history, with each team having won after trailing by five goals:
On February 25, 1983 the Boston Bruins led the Buffalo Sabres 6–1 with 14:03 left in the second period. The Sabres then scored six unanswered goals to win 7–6.
On January 21, 1985, the Los Angeles Kings led the Edmonton Oilers 7–2 with 1:28 remaining in the second period. The Oilers then scored six unanswered goals to win 8–7.
On January 26, 1987, the Calgary Flames erased a 5–0 deficit against the Toronto Maple Leafs, starting with a goal by Steve Bozek with only 13:58 remaining in the third period. To date, it is the largest comeback with the least amount of time remaining in NHL history.
On December 30, 1989, the Toronto Maple Leafs were down 6–1 to the Boston Bruins, coming back with six unanswered goals to defeat the Bruins 7–6 in overtime. The comeback began on a Vincent Damphousse goal with 1:05 left in the second period.
On December 26, 1991, the New York Rangers came back from a five-goal deficit against Washington Capitals, winning 8–6. The Rangers began the comeback on a goal by John Ogrodnick with one-tenth of a second left in the first period.
On March 3, 1999, the Colorado Avalanche came back from five goals down against the Florida Panthers, winning the game 7–5. The Avalanche scored seven goals in the final 22 minutes, with Peter Forsberg leading the way with three goals and three assists.
On November 29, 2000, the St. Louis Blues came back from a five-goal deficit against the Toronto Maple Leafs, winning 6–5 in overtime. The Maple Leafs led 5–0 with 15:09 remaining in the third period.
On February 19, 2008, Montreal Canadiens defeated the New York Rangers 6–5 in a shootout, having rallied down 5–0. Michael Ryder scored to begin the comeback with 12:32 left in the second period.
On October 12, 2009, the Chicago Blackhawks defeated the Calgary Flames 6–5 in overtime, capping a five-goal comeback after being down 5–0. John Madden scored with 2:18 left in the first period to begin the comeback.

Playoffs
The following playoff comeback is the largest in NHL history:
On April 10, 1982, the Los Angeles Kings trailed the heavily-favored Edmonton Oilers 5–0 going into the third period of play in Game 3 of a best-of-five series. The Kings rallied to score 5 unanswered goals in the third period, and won the game 6–5 in overtime on a goal by Daryl Evans. The game was dubbed the Miracle on Manchester, referring to the Kings arena, The Forum, on Manchester Boulevard, and remains the largest single-game comeback in NHL playoff history.

In National Hockey League series play, the 2010 Philadelphia Flyers became the third NHL team to win a seven-game series after being down 3–0 to Boston (the others being the 1942 Toronto Maple Leafs and the 1975 New York Islanders). This feat was once again accomplished in 2014 by the Los Angeles Kings. After being down three games in their series against the San Jose Sharks, the Kings rallied and won the next four. This momentum seemingly carried them in the remainder of their series, culminating with their winning the Stanley Cup.

See also:  List of teams to overcome 3–0 series deficits

Motorsport
In the 1985 Winston 500, Bill Elliott's car suffered a broken oil fitting and nearly went two laps off of the pace. Elliott was able to make up the near two lap difference without the aid of a caution flag or the draft, winning the race by over a second.

In the 1995 Indianapolis 500, Jacques Villeneuve overtook the pace car by mistake and was penalized with two laps, but recovered and won the race.

During the 2011 Canadian Grand Prix, Jenson Button fell to last place on lap 37 after a collision during a torrential downpour. Over the following 33 laps, Button managed to climb through the field in a recovery drive that culminated in his catching up to the leader, Sebastian Vettel and after an error, Button overtook him on the last lap to win. 

Sebastian Vettel won the 2012 Formula One World Championship at Brazil by recovering from a spin on lap 1 to finish 6th and secure the title.

Sergio Perez was due to retire at the conclusion of the 2020 Formula One World Championship as he was without a contract, and having raced 190 times, he had never claimed a win. After a first lap collision that saw him in last place, the Mexican driver clawed his way through the field to take first place, scoring his first ever win and (in part) securing a new contract with Red Bull Racing for 2021. At 190 races, Perez broke the record for the longest career without a win.

Tennis

In professional tennis, the match goes to the first player to win a predetermined number of sets, usually two or three in professional tournaments. There have been numerous instances of a player being down one or two sets to none and coming back to win the remaining sets in a row to win the match. It is theoretically possible for a player to come back from a deficit at any point in the game.

In the 1987 Wimbledon Championships, Jimmy Connors faced Mikael Pernfors in the fourth round. Connors lost the first two sets and was down 4–1 in the third set before taking 14 straight points and winning the set. Pernfors then took a 3–0 lead in the fourth set, but Connors subsequently broke Pernfors twice to win the fourth set. Connors then won the fifth and deciding set to win the match.

In the 1995 French Open, Jana Novotná faced Chanda Rubin in the third round. Rubin won first set after tie-break, but lost second 6-4. In decider third set she was down 5-0, and in the sixth game was 0-40 to Novotná. Rubin broke, and despite her rival having nine matchballs, she won the match after a second tie-break.

In the 1999 French Open final between Andre Agassi and Andrei Medvedev, Medvedev dominated the first two sets (1-6, 2-6) before Agassi mounted a come-from-behind victory, winning the remaining three sets (6-4, 6–3, 6-4) which allowed him to complete a career Grand Slam.

Track and field
In the 10,000 metres at the 1972 Summer Olympics at Munich, runner Lasse Virén fell in the twelfth lap after getting tangled with Emiel Puttemans, with Tunisia's Mohamed Gammoudi also falling after being tripped by Viren's legs. Despite losing about 20 metres, Virén caught up with, and then outpaced, the pack, breaking Ron Clarke's 7-year-old world record with a time of 27:38:40

Yacht racing
In the 2013 America's Cup, Oracle Team USA (representing the Golden Gate Yacht Club), fell behind the challenger Emirates Team New Zealand (representing the Royal New Zealand Yacht Squadron) by a score of 8 races to 1. Oracle had to win the last eight consecutive races to come from behind and win the competition. This has been described as "possibly the greatest comeback in sports history".
In the 2019 Roma per tutti yacht race O' Guerriero, a Comet 41S representing the CS Yacht Club, after falling behind more than 140 miles off the leader, came back to score the overall IRC victory for the second consecutive time (after the 2018 victory) becoming the third boat in the race history to achieve a back to back win.

References

Sports terminology